Zurzach is a municipality in the district of Zurzach in the canton of Aargau in Switzerland. On 1 January 2022 the former municipalities of Bad Zurzach, Baldingen, Böbikon, Kaiserstuhl, Rekingen, Rietheim, Rümikon and Wislikofen merged into the new municipality of Zurzach. It is the seat of the district. Bad Zurzach was previously known as Zurzach.

History

Bad Zurzach

Baldingen

Böbikon

Kaiserstuhl

Rekingen

Rietheim

Rümikon

Wislikofen

Geography

Demographics

References

External links

Cultural property of national significance in Aargau
Municipalities of Aargau
2022 establishments in Switzerland